Nesey Gallons is an American solo recording artist associated with the Elephant 6 Collective, and a former member of the bands Circulatory System and The Music Tapes.  Gallons also works as a producer and engineer, including The Music Tapes' album Music Tapes for Clouds and Tornadoes, Julian Koster's The Singing Saw at Christmastime, Circulatory System's album Signal Morning, and the Hot New Mexicans eponymous LP.

In 2014, Gallons debuted as an actor, in the film Present.

Discography

Albums
When We Were Clouds (songs) (CD-R; 2002)
The Silhouette Museum (sound collage) (CD-R; 2002)
Now Gargling (sound collage) (CD-R; 2003)
Two Bicycles (songs) (CD-R; 2003)
Somewhere We Both Walk (story / soundtrack) (CD-R; 2003; Reissue; 2015)
Eyes & Eyes & Eyes Ago (songs) (CD-R, 2006; CD/LP; 2009)
Southern Winter (Smouldering Porches) (songs) (CD-R; 2010)
Swan Phase (sound collage) (CD-R; 2011)
When I Was An Ice Skater (songs) (CD-R; 2012)
Blackout Era (Smouldering Porches) (songs) (CD-R; 2013)
Boston, 1999 (sound collage) (CD-R; 2013)
Misprisons (songs) (Compact Cassette, Digital; 2020)

Films
Present (2013)

References

The Elephant 6 Recording Company artists
American singer-songwriters
Singers from Maine
American indie rock musicians
Living people
1984 births
Songwriters from Maine
21st-century American singers
Queer musicians